Robin Östlind (born 14 March 1990) is a Swedish former footballer who played as a midfielder.

References

External links

1990 births
Living people
Swedish footballers
Sweden youth international footballers
Association football forwards
Kalmar FF players
IFK Mariehamn players
Oskarshamns AIK players
Östers IF players
Falkenbergs FF players
Ettan Fotboll players
Allsvenskan players
Superettan players
Veikkausliiga players
IFK Luleå players
Swedish expatriate footballers
Expatriate footballers in Finland
Swedish expatriate sportspeople in Finland